Nebraska Highway 69 is a highway in southeastern Nebraska.  Its southern terminus is at an intersection with U.S. Highway 34 east of Waco.  Its northern terminus is at an intersection with U.S. Highway 81 and Nebraska Highway 92 in Shelby.

Route description
Nebraska Highway 69 begins at US 34 east of Waco and heads in a northbound direction through farmland.  It passes through Gresham before continuing northward.  It makes a slight turn to the west just north of Gresham before turning northward again.  The highway continues into Shelby where it terminates at an intersection with US 81 and NE 92.

Major intersections

References

External links

Nebraska Roads: NE 61-80

069
Transportation in York County, Nebraska
Transportation in Polk County, Nebraska